The Matter of France, also known as the Carolingian cycle, is a body of literature and legendary material associated with the history of France, in particular involving Charlemagne and his associates. The cycle springs from the Old French chansons de geste, and was later adapted into a variety of art forms, including Renaissance epics and operas. Together with the Matter of Britain, which concerned King Arthur, and the Matter of Rome, comprising material derived from and inspired by classical mythology, it was one of the great European literary cycles that figured repeatedly in medieval literature.

Three Matters
The Matter of France was one of the "Three Matters" repeatedly recalled in medieval literature. It was contrasted with the Matter of Britain, the legendary history of Great Britain, Brittany and King Arthur; and the Matter of Rome, which represented the medieval poets' interpretations of Ancient Greek and Roman mythology and history. The three names were first used by the twelfth-century French poet Jean Bodel, author of the Chanson de Saisnes, a chanson de geste in which he wrote:

Description
About 1215 Bertrand de Bar-sur-Aube, in the introductory lines to his Girart de Vienne, set out a subdivision of the Matter of France into three cycles, which have been adopted by many modern critics as a useful means of grouping the chansons de geste. These are his words:

The cycles can be outlined as follows:

 The Geste du roi, whose chief character is Charlemagne, seen as champion of Christianity.  This cycle contains the best known of the chansons, the Chanson de Roland.
 La Geste de Garin de Monglane, whose central character was Guillaume d'Orange, identifiable with William, Count of Toulouse.  These dealt with knights who were typically younger sons, not heirs, and who seek land and glory through combat with the Infidels. The twenty-four poems of this geste belong to the generation after Charlemagne, during the reign of an ineffectual Louis. The Chanson de Guillaume is one of the oldest poems of this geste.
 The Geste de Doon de Mayence, in which the hero, as in the Geste de Guillaume, often suffers from royal injustice, but is goaded into rebellion.

Central figures of the Matter of France include Charlemagne and his paladins, especially Roland, hero of The Song of Roland, and his companion Oliver, who was frequently cast in conflict with the Muslim champion Fierabras. Originally, the Matter of France contained tales of war and martial valour, being focused on the conflict between the Franks and Saracens or Moors during the period of Charles Martel and Charlemagne. The Chanson de Roland, for example, is about the Battle of Roncevaux Pass during the Moorish invasion of southern France.  As the genre matured, elements of fantasy and magic tended to accrue to the tales.  The magic horse Bayard, for example, is a recurring figure in many of the tales.

The fundamental character of the "Matter of France" is feudal and Christian (in a crusading form). Although viewed as idolators, the Saracens were not necessarily depicted as un-chivalrous. The earliest gestes were likely sung by a jongleur, accompanied by a fiddle. It is apparent that the authors were ignorant of the fact that Islam is monotheistic. D.J.A. Ross says that people of the Middle Ages appear to have regarded the gestes as generally historical.

Einhard's Vita Caroli describes the Basque ambush at Roncevaux as driving the Frankish rearguard down the valley. The poet who wrote the Chanson de Roland did not hesitate to update the military tactics to a set-piece cavalry charge on the part of the Saracens, although retaining a landscape unsuitable for couched lances.

List of works

For a list of chansons that can be attached to each of these cycles, see Chanson de geste.

In later literature
After the period of the chanson de geste, the Matter of France lived on. Its most well known survival is in the Italian epics by Matteo Maria Boiardo, Ludovico Ariosto, and a number of lesser authors who worked the material; their tales of Orlando innamorato ("Roland in Love") and Orlando furioso ("Roland Gone Mad") were inspired by the chansons de geste. These works, in turn, inspired Torquato Tasso's Gerusalemme liberata and Edmund Spenser's The Faerie Queene, although these latter works have been separated from the Matter of France and put in the respective settings of the First Crusade and an imaginary faerie land.

Tales of the Matter of France were also found in Old Norse, where the Karlamagnus Saga was written in the thirteenth century in Norway; it contains a synopsis of the main stories of the cycle. Indeed, until a major revival in the 19th century breathed new life into the Arthurian cycle, the Matter of France had enjoyed similar renown to the Matter of Britain.

Modern fantasy literature has used the Matter of France far less than the Matter of Britain, although L. Sprague de Camp and Fletcher Pratt set one of their Harold Shea stories (The Castle of Iron) in the world of the Matter of France, and Poul Anderson's Three Hearts and Three Lions references the Matter of France. Through Anderson's book, the Matter of France also had some influence on the popular Dungeons & Dragons game. Italo Calvino's fantasy novel The Nonexistent Knight also takes place in this world.

Notes

External links
 The Matter of France by Alexx Kay
 Legends: Paladins and Princes by Paula Kate Marmor
 How Oliver Fought for France and the Faith by Agnes Grozier Herbertson
 The Keeping of the Passes by Agnes Grozier Herbertson

 
Medieval literature
Medieval legends
History of literature
Romance (genre)
Metanarratives